Andrey Sergeyevich Chekhonin (Russian: Андрей Сергеевич Чехонин; born 11 November 1988) is a Russian kickboxer, karateka and savateur. As of May 2022, he was the #7 ranked middleweight kickboxer in the world by Combat Press.

Kickboxing career
Checkhonin took part in the -80 kilogram event of the 2016 Tatneft Cup. Although he was able to stop Alim Ozhev in the quarterfinals, held on August 11, 2016, and Surik Magakyan in the semifinals, held on September 22, 2016, he suffered a unanimous decision loss to Nikolay Lushin in the tournament finals, which were held on November 11, 2016.

Checkhonin participated in the 2017 Kung Fu World Cup two months later, as the one-day tournament for the KFWC Savate Pro World -80kg title was held on January 24, 2017. He was able to overcome Nicola Gallo by unanimous decision in the semifinals, but suffered a split decision loss to Mehdi Kada in the finals.

Checkhonin fought in the -80 kilogram event of the 2017 Tatneft Cup as well, but lost the semifinal bout against Sher Mamazulunov by an extra round decision, after he himself won an extra round decision against Dimitris Chiotis in the tournament quarterfinals. Chechhonin would go on to lose two more fights, by decision to Mamuka Usubyan at Fair Fight IV on September 30, 2017 and by knockout to Artur Kyshenko at Kunlun Fight 68 on December 17, 2017.

Checkhonin made his SENSHI debut against Aslan Saduakas at Senshi 2 on April 20, 2019. He won the fight by a first-round knockout. Checkhonin then captured the Senshi Middleweight tournament title with second-round stoppages of Mohammad Amin Asadi and Ruslan Nasibulin at Senshi 3 on July 3, 2019.

Checkhonin faced Sergey Veselkin at WLF: Russia vs. China on September 20, 2019. He won the fight by decision.

Chechhonin faced the WAKO-Pro Low-Kick Rules Light Cruiserweight (-85.1 kg) World champion Abderrahim Chafay at Senshi 5 on February 22, 2020. He won the fight by a first-round technical knockout. A month later, Chechhonin took part in the Fair Fight Middleweight tournament, held at Fair Fight XI on March 21, 2020. He won the semifinal bout against Vladimir Degtyarev and the final bout against Gadzhi Majidov in the same manner - by decision.

Chechhonin faced Mădălin Mogoș for the KWU Middleweight Championship at Senshi 6 on August 21, 2020. He won the fight by a first-round knockout. Checkhonin then had his ten-fight winning streak snapped by Ali Aliyev at Battle of Champions 12 on November 13, 2020, who beat him by decision. He rebounded from this loss by making two successful KWU title defenses, as he beat Anwar Dira by a second-round technical knockout at Senshi 7 on February 27, 2021, in his first title defense and Ricardo Fernandes by a first-round knockout at Senshi 8 on May 22, 2021, in his second title defense.

Championships and accomplishments

Professional
Kyokushin World Union
 2020 KWU Middleweight Championship (two defenses)
Fair Fight Promotion
 2020 Fair Fight Promotion Middleweight Championship
 2020 Fair Fight XI Middleweight Tournament Winner
World Association of Kickboxing Organizations
2020 WAKO-Pro Low-Kick Rules World Championship -85.1 kg
Battle of Champions
Battle of Champions Middleweight Championship
Senshi
Senshi 3 Middleweight Tournament Winner
Tatneft Cup 
 2016 Tatneft Cup -80kg Runner-up

Amateur
World Association of Kickboxing Organizations
 2015 WAKO World Championships Low kick -86kg

Professional kickboxing record

|- 
|-  style="background:#fbb;"
| 2021-12-04 || Loss ||align=left| Ruben Lee || Senshi 10 || Varna, Bulgaria || Extra round decision (split) || 4 || 3:00
|- 
|-  style="background:#fbb;"
| 2021-07-10 || Loss ||align=left| Florin Lambagiu || Senshi 9 || Varna, Bulgaria || Extra round decision (split) || 4 || 3:00
|-
! style=background:white colspan=9 |
|-
|-  bgcolor="#cfc"
| 2021-05-22 || Win ||align=left| Ricardo Fernandes || Senshi 8 || Sofia, Bulgaria || KO (low kick) || 1 || 2:43 
|-
! style=background:white colspan=9 |
|- 
|-  bgcolor="#cfc"
| 2021-02-27 || Win ||align=left| Anwar Dira || Senshi 7 || Sofia, Bulgaria || TKO (referee stoppage) || 2 || 2:05
|-
! style=background:white colspan=9 |
|- 
|-  style="background:#fbb;"
| 2020-11-13 || Loss ||align=left| Ali Aliyev || Battle of Champions 12 || Moscow, Russia || Decision || 3 || 3:00
|-
! style=background:white colspan=9 |
|- 
|-  bgcolor="#cfc"
| 2020-08-21 || Win ||align=left| Mădălin Mogoș || Senshi 6 || Varna, Bulgaria || KO (low kick) || 1 || 0:32  
|-
! style=background:white colspan=9 |
|- 
|-  bgcolor="#cfc"
| 2020-03-21 || Win ||align=left| Gadzhi Majidov || Fair Fight XI, Final || Yekaterinburg, Russia || Decision || 3 || 3:00
|-
! style=background:white colspan=9 |
|-  
|-  bgcolor="#cfc"
| 2020-03-21 || Win ||align=left| Vladimir Degtyarev || Fair Fight XI, Semifinal || Yekaterinburg, Russia || Decision || 3 || 3:00
|-  
|-  bgcolor="#cfc"
| 2020-02-22 || Win ||align=left| Abderrahim Chafay || Senshi 5 || Varna, Bulgaria || TKO (referee stoppage) || 1 || 2:55  
|-
! style=background:white colspan=9 |
|- 
|-  bgcolor="#cfc"
| 2019-11-01 || Win ||align=left| Ashabali Magomedov || Battle of Champions 11 || Moscow, Russia || Decision || 3 || 3:00
|-
! style=background:white colspan=9 |
|- 
|-  bgcolor="#cfc"
| 2019-09-20 || Win ||align=left| Sergey Veselkin || WLF: Russia vs. China || Moscow, Russia || Decision || 3 || 3:00
|- 
|-  bgcolor="#cfc"
| 2019-07-03 || Win ||align=left| Ruslan Nasibulin || Senshi 3, Final || Varna, Bulgaria || TKO (referee stopapge) || 2 || 1:58
|-
! style=background:white colspan=9 |
|-  
|-  bgcolor="#cfc"
| 2019-07-03 || Win ||align=left| Mohammad Amin Asadi || Senshi 3, Semifinal || Varna, Bulgaria || KO (left hook) || 2 || 2:31  
|- 
|-  bgcolor="#cfc"
| 2019-04-20 || Win ||align=left| Aslan Saduakas || Senshi 2 || Bulgaria || KO (low kicks) || 1 || 1:26 
|-
|-  bgcolor="#cfc"
| 2018-09-18 || Win ||align=left| Dmitry Baranov || Royal Fight 4 || Minsk, Belarus || Ext. R. Decision (Unanimous) || 4 || 3:00
|-
|-  style="background:#fbb;"
| 2017-12-17|| Loss||align=left| Artur Kyshenko || Kunlun Fight 68 || China || KO (Left Body Hook)  || 1 || 1:29

|-  style="text-align:center; background:#fbb;"
| 2017-09-30 || Loss ||align=left| Mamuka Usubyan || Fair Fight IV || Yekaterinburg, Russia || Decision (Unanimous) || 3 || 3:00
|-
|-  bgcolor="#fbb"
| 2017-07-19|| Loss ||align=left| Sher Mamazulunov || TATNEFT CUP 2017, -80kg Quarter Final || Kazan, Russia || Ext.R Decision|| 4 || 3:00

|-  bgcolor="#cfc"
| 2017-04-22|| Win||align=left| Dimitris Chiotis || TATNEFT CUP 2017, -80kg 1/8 Final || Kazan, Russia || Ext.R Decision|| 4 || 3:00

|-  style="background:#fbb;"  
| 2017-01-24|| Loss ||align=left| Mehdi Kada || Kung Fu World Cup, Final|| China ||  Decision (Split)|| 3 || 2:00
|-
! style=background:white colspan=9 |

|-  style="background:#cfc;"  
| 2017-01-24|| Win ||align=left| Nicola Gallo || Kung Fu World Cup, Semi Final|| China || Decision (Unanimous)|| 3 || 2:00

|-  style="background:#fbb;"  
| 2016-11-11|| Loss ||align=left| Nikolay Lushin || Tatneft Cup 2016, -80 kg Tournament Final|| Kazan, Russia || Ext.R Decision || 4 || 3:00
|-
! style=background:white colspan=9 |

|-  style="background:#cfc;"  
| 2016-09-22|| Win||align=left| Surik Magakyan || Tatneft Cup 2016, -80 kg Tournament Semi Final|| Kazan, Russia || KO (Low kick) || 1 || 2:00

|-  style="background:#cfc;"  
| 2016-08-11 || Win||align=left| Alim Ozhev || Tatneft Cup 2016, -80 kg Tournament Quarter Final|| Kazan, Russia || KO (Low kicks) || 2 || 2:30

|-  style="background:#cfc;"  
| 2014-11-21 || Win||align=left| Nikita Korotkikh || Battle of Champions 7 || Moscow, Russia || Decision || 3 || 3:00

|-  style="background:#cfc;"  
| 2014-07-05 || Win||align=left| Andrei Mudrik || Clash of Champions Tournament, Final || Moscow, Russia || TKO (low kciks)||  || 
|-
! style=background:white colspan=9 |

|-  style="background:#cfc;"  
| 2014-07-05 || Win||align=left| Askat Zhartunsynov || Clash of Champions Tournament, Semi Final || Moscow, Russia || Decision || 3 || 3:00 

|-  style="background:#cfc;"  
| 2014-07-05 || Win||align=left| Artem Sosnovsky || Clash of Champions Tournament, Quarter Final || Moscow, Russia || Decision || 3 || 3:00 

|-  style="background:#cfc;"  
| 2014-04-26 || Win||align=left| Alexey Sidorenko || Russia Grand Prix, Final || Voronezh, Russia || Decision || 3 || 3:00

|-  style="background:#cfc;"  
| 2014-04-26 || Win||align=left| Nikita Chub || Russia Grand Prix, Semi Final || Voronezh, Russia || Decision || 3 || 3:00

|-  bgcolor="#cfc"
| ? || Win ||align=left| Vasily Azyrev || || Russia || Decision || 3 || 3:00

|- style="background:#fbb;"
| 2012-04-28 || Loss||align=left| Zinedine Hameur-Lain || Tatneft Cup 2012, 1/4 final (+91 kg) || Kazan, Russia || Decision (unanimous) || 4 || 3:00

|-  bgcolor="#cfc"
| 2011-12-17|| Win ||align=left| Patrik Lidert || Tatneft Cup 2011, -80kg 1/8 Final || Kazan, Russia || Ext.R Decision|| 4 || 3:00

|-  bgcolor="#cfc"
| 2010-12-20|| Win ||align=left| Mikhail Novikov || Tatneft Cup 2010, -80kg 1/8 Final || Kazan, Russia || TKO (Right hook)|| 1 || 2:15
|-
| colspan=9 | Legend:

See also
List of male kickboxers

References

1988 births
Living people  
Russian male kickboxers 
Cruiserweight kickboxers  
Russian male karateka
Russian savateurs